The Hopkins Manuscript is a social-political dystopian novel published by R. C. Sherriff in 1939. Originally titled An Ordinary Man, the novel was published with its present title by Victor Gollancz, then republished as a Pan paperback in 1958 under the title The Cataclysm. The book was further published by The Macmillan Company in 1963 and by Persephone Books in 2002.

The story is set in England, where the main character, Edgar Hopkins, writes a narrative about a catastrophe in which the Moon collides with Earth, and his life afterward. The foreword has the perspective of an academic society 1,000 years in the future finding the manuscript as an historical document.

References 

1939 British novels
1939 science fiction novels
1955 science fiction novels
Dystopian novels
British political novels
British science fiction novels
Novels set in London
Novels about impact events
Works about the Moon
Novels by R. C. Sherriff